Charest may refer to:

Charest (surname)
Charest River, a tributary of the Sainte-Anne River in Quebec, Canada
Lake Charest (Mékinac), in Québec, Canada
Autoroute Charest, a superhighway located in Quebec City, Canada